Acres Farm Meadow is a 4.2 hectare biological Site of Special Scientific Interest (SSSI) in Wiltshire, notified in 1989. It lies between the villages of Somerford Keynes and Minety. The SSSI is the former site of a mediaeval ridge and furrow system which lies on the Upper Jurassic Oxford Clay. The site is home to grasses, sedges and herbs. Trees such as oak, maple, English elm (when notified, prior to Dutch elm disease) and hawthorn can be found in the hedgerows on the site, which provide nesting sites for lesser whitethroat, willow warbler, yellowhammer and bullfinch.

References

External links
https://designatedsites.naturalengland.org.uk/ Natural England (SSSI information)

Sites of Special Scientific Interest in Wiltshire
Sites of Special Scientific Interest notified in 1989
Meadows in Wiltshire